Krasnopol may refer to:

 Krasnopol, Podlaskie Voivodeship, a village in north-eastern Poland
 Gmina Krasnopol, an administrative district in Poland, of which Krasnopol is the seat
 Krasnopol (weapon system), a Soviet-designed artillery munition

See also
 Krasnopolov, a village in Russia
 Krasnopolye, a village in Russia